Dermaleipa minians is a species of moth in the family Erebidae first described by Paul Mabille in 1884. The species is found on Madagascar.

References

Ophiusini
Lepidoptera of Madagascar
Moths of Madagascar
Moths of Africa